{{DISPLAYTITLE:C16H13O7}}

The molecular formula C16H13O7 (or C16H13O7+, molar mass : 317.27 g/mol, exact mass : 317.066127317) or C16H13ClO7 (exact mass : 352.03498) may refer to:
 Petunidin, an anthocyanidin
 Pulchellidin, an anthocyanidin